Mike Elston is an American football coach and former player who is currently the defensive line coach and recruiting coordinator for the Michigan Wolverines football team.

Coaching career

Notre Dame
On January 10, 2018, Elston was promoted to associate head coach and defensive line coach of the Notre Dame football program.

Michigan
In 2022 he decided to join Jim Harbaugh at Michigan as the defensive line coach and the recruiting coordinator.

References

External links
 Notre Dame profile

1974 births
Living people
American football linebackers
Eastern Michigan Eagles football coaches
Central Michigan Chippewas football coaches
Cincinnati Bearcats football coaches
Michigan Wolverines football coaches
Michigan Wolverines football players
Notre Dame Fighting Irish football coaches
People from St. Mary's, Ohio
Coaches of American football from Ohio
Players of American football from Ohio